Epichilo vartianae is a moth in the family Crambidae. It was first described by Stanisław Błeszyński in 1965. It is found in Pakistan.

References

Crambinae
Moths described in 1965